The Bath Literature Festival, held annually in Bath, Somerset, England, was an important date in the national literary calendar, playing host to an array of journalists, novelists, poets, politicians, actors, comedians, writers and biographers between 1995 and 2016.

Established in 1995 and supported by Andrew Brownsword, the festival is sponsored by The Independent. In 2003 writer and broadcaster Sarah LeFanu became Artistic Director. The 2008 Festival included Tariq Ali, Martin Amis, Margaret Drabble, A. C. Grayling and Steven Berkoff.  In 2009, James Runcie became Artistic Director. In 2014, Viv Groskop took over as Artistic Director.

The Bath Literature Festival has now been superseded by The Bath Festival, a new multi-arts festival with literature and music at the heart.

References

External links
Bath Literature Festival

1995 establishments in England
Literature
Literary festivals in England
Festivals established in 1995